Lake Redstone is in La Valle in northern Sauk County of Wisconsin, United States.

Lake Redstone is a reservoir. Construction of the lake was started in 1964. Lake Redstone has no mandatory owners association, but owners are encouraged to join the Lake Redstone Property Owners Association. Lake Redstone has a  watershed to the north from Juneau County that fills the lake. The dam is located at the south end and has a top draw spillway. All excess water creates a cascading waterfall and eventually flows into the Baraboo River. It is located in Sauk County, approximately seven miles from Reedsburg, and only three miles from LaValle.

External links
Lake map

Reservoirs in Wisconsin
Lakes of Sauk County, Wisconsin